Nyköping Municipality in Sweden held a municipal election on 20 September 1998. The election was part of the local elections and held on the same day as the general election.

Results
The number of seats remained at 61 with the Social Democrats winning the most at 25, a drop of nine from 1994, losing its overall majority. The number of valid ballots cast were 30,603.

By constituency

Urban and rural vote

Percentage points

By votes

Electoral wards

Nyköping

Rural areas

References

Nyköping municipal elections
Nyköping